Leaf River may refer to:

Rivers

Canada
Leaf River (Quebec)

United States
Leaf River (Illinois)
Leaf River (Minnesota)
Leaf River (Mississippi)

Cities and towns
Leaf River, Illinois
Leaf River, Minnesota, former town

Townships
Leaf River Township, Illinois
Leaf River Township, Wadena County, Minnesota

See also 
 Leaf (disambiguation)